William Paul Studholme (23 April 1864 – 23 February 1941) was a New Zealand barrister and cricketer. He played in two first-class matches for Canterbury from 1887 to 1889.

He was the son of John Studholme of Christchurch. He matriculated at Magdalen College, Oxford in 1882, graduating B.A. in 1886. He was called to the bar at the Inner Temple in 1887.

See also
 List of Canterbury representative cricketers

References

External links
 

1864 births
1941 deaths
New Zealand cricketers
Canterbury cricketers
Moorhouse–Rhodes family